Ancramdale is a hamlet in Columbia County, New York, United States. Ancramdale has a post office with ZIP code 12503.

References

Hamlets in Columbia County, New York
Hamlets in New York (state)